Alf-Gerd Deckert (born 4 July 1955) is a retired cross-country skier from East Germany. He competed at the 1980 Winter Olympics in the 15 km, 30 km and 50 km events and finished in 37th, 9th and 26th place, respectively.

He was married to Petra Thümer, a German Olympic swimmer. His brother Manfred is a retired Olympic ski jumper.

References

1955 births
Living people
German male cross-country skiers
Olympic cross-country skiers of East Germany
Cross-country skiers at the 1980 Winter Olympics
Sportspeople from Halle (Saale)